Events from the year 1607 in Sweden

Incumbents
 Monarch – Charles IX

Events

 Coronation of Charles IX.
 The Swedes retake Paide
 Magnus Brahe (1564–1633) becomes the Lord High Constable of Sweden

Births

 March - Fredrik Gustafsson Stenbock, nobleman (dead 1652)

Deaths

 February - Gustav of Sweden   (born 1568) 
 November - Mauritz Stensson Leijonhufvud, nobleman (born 1559)
 December - Abraham Angermannus, archbishop   (born 1540)

References

 
Years of the 17th century in Sweden
Sweden